A pernette is a prop to support pottery in a kiln so that pottery does not touch each other or kiln's floor.

Pernette may also refer to:

Pernette (given name)
Pernette (surname)
"La Pernette" a track from Malicorne's album Malicorne 1
Pernette, a 1868 poetic work of French poet Victor de Laprade